Joshi is an Indian family name

Joshi may also refer to:
Joshi (wrestling), a female wrestler in Japanese professional wrestling
Seishin Joshi Gakuin, a school
Japanese particles or joshi